Lindsey is a small village and a civil parish, located in mid-to-south Suffolk, under the purview of Babergh District Council.

Layout
The parish contains the villages and hamlets of Lindsey, Lindsey Tye and Rose Green and collectively they contain about 92 households, albeit over a wide area.

Rose Green contains four listed buildings: Chapel of St James, Rose Green Farmhouse, White Rose Inn, and an unnamed cottage.

Sights in the area include St James's Chapel, a 13th-century thatched chapel under the protection of English Heritage.

Location grid

References

External links

Villages in Suffolk
Civil parishes in Suffolk
Babergh District